"I'm Gonna Love You Anyway" is a song recorded by American country music artist Trace Adkins.  It was released in July 2000 as the third and final single from the album More....  The song reached #36 on the Billboard Hot Country Singles & Tracks chart.  The song was written by Stacy Dean Campbell and Dean Miller.

Chart performance

References

2000 singles
1999 songs
Trace Adkins songs
Songs written by Dean Miller
Capitol Records Nashville singles